The Bidet was a type of small horse from France, now extinct. It was a landrace developed principally in the area around Brittany, Morvan, Auvergne, Poitou, and Burgundy. It stood about 110–135 centimetres at the withers. Two distinct groups are documented, which were bred in a semi-feral state.

Bidets were first identified in the 15th century. They were used as "jack-of-all-trades" animals, equally suited for riding, farm work and passenger transport. They declined during the 19th century, when railways and better-kept roads pressured horse breeders into specialising their breeds. Despite the animal's disappearance, the name "bidet" survives in several French cultural references.

Etymology and terminology 
The term "bidet" first appeared in 1564, used by François Rabelais to describe a small horse. He probably borrowed the word from the Old French "bider", meaning "to trott," itself derived from "rabider," meaning "to run in haste," which was used in the 14th century. According to the Trésor de la langue française, a bidet horse is a "small post horse, stocky and vigorous, ridden by couriers; a small saddle horse or draft horse." The usage of the feminine form "bidette" can also be found in one of Gustave Flaubert's works.

The word "bidet" came to refer to a small saddle horse of the people, of a "genre peu élevé" ("a lowly kind"); thus, this term also came to have a pejorative connotation. Some tillers during the mid-20th century still referred to their workhorses as bidets, but usage of the term has significantly decreased, with "poney" replacing it as the common word.

The plumbing fixture known as the bidet has been referred to by this name since 1739, coming from a metaphor that most likely refers to the straddling position that one must assume while using the bidet.

History 
The history of the bidet is associated with the history of commoners and the state. These horses were only valuable for the work they were able to carry out at a low cost. Therefore, the beauty, size, coat color, and sex of the horse were of no importance; only working ability and hardiness were taken into account. The breeding of this type of horse was carried out against the recommendations of the Haras Nationaux (national stud farms), who, in hoping for their eradication, criticized them as "little ugly horses." They were generally raised semi-wild without any true selection process. During antiquity, Brittany and Normandy had small horses, possibly introduced by the Celts during their migrations to Asia. During the 16th century, Normandy was known to have sturdy and heavy bidets, capable of pulling over long distances and serving as stagecoaches or artillery horses.

17th and 18th centuries 
During the 17th century, most of the existing bidet horses were located in Brittany. In the following century, they could also be found in Auvergne, Poitou, Morvan, and Burgundy. The regions of Morvan and Auvergne (with Vivarais and Limousin) raised saddle bidets. This type of breeding flourished until the end of the 18th century, when bidets were in high demand by the belligerents of the French Revolution and thus frequently requisitioned by military forces. They were actively sought after by merchants, who sometimes traveled dozens of kilometers to various villages to buy and resell them.

Disappearance 
Several hippologists, among them Jacques Mulliez, observe the disappearance of the bidet as having occurred from the 19th century up until the beginning of the 20th century. According to Bernadette Lizet, this type of breeding was abandoned due to a multitude of factors, including improvements in roads (allowing the passage of horse-drawn vehicles), the modernization of agriculture, the digging of canals, and the arrival of the railroad. The bidet's disappearance began in the "breeding countries" where one could find mares, as those fit for the saddle were eliminated in favor of those stronger and bigger horses that were better suited for pulling. The introduction of draft mares in the Bazois region, as documented by surviving sales records, was to the detriment of the cheaper bidets, who were less efficient in pulling. The bidets of Morvan, crossbred with stallions and draft mares, would disappear completely during the second half of the 19th century. In Brenne, the "brennou" pony, a variety of bidet, disappeared with the draining of the region's marshes. Another type of bidet that inhabited the moors and woods near Derval and Blain also disappeared.

During the 1850s, the Breton bidet became much less sought after, at least in the regions of Cornouaille and Morbihan. Around 1859, it was only still used in its place of origin, despite its hardiness and reliability. It was replaced by other Breton draft horses from Léon and Trégor. Small saddle horses, like the Norman merchant's bidet, were derided by many, who were instead in favor of carriage breeds. By the beginning of the 20th century, Breton bidets were "nothing more than a memory." The disappearance was not only physical, for Daniel Roche and Daniel Reytier have also noted a change in the common vocabulary; the word "bidet" was gradually substituted by "poney" (pony), a term imported from English speaking countries during the 1820s and 1830s.

References 

Horse breeds originating in France
Extinct horse breeds
Horse breeds